The Gabon gurnard (Chelidonichthys gabonensis) is a species of marine ray-finned fishes belonging to the family Triglidae, the gurnards and sea robins. This species is of commercial importance as a food fish.

References

External links

Gabon gurnard
Fish of Gabon
Marine fauna of West Africa
Gabon gurnard